The Fundação Nacional de Artes (National Arts Foundation), Funarte is a foundation of the Brazilian government linked to the Ministry of Culture. It operates throughout the national territory and is the agency responsible for developing public policies to foster the visual arts, music, dance, theater, and circus.

Overview 

It aims to encourage the training of artists, technicians and producers; the production, practice, development and dissemination of the arts; the development of research; the preservation of memory, and the formation of audiences for the arts in Brazil.

To this end, Funarte grants scholarships and awards, maintains programs for the circulation of artists and cultural goods, promotes workshops, publishes books, recovers and creates collections, provides technical consulting, and supports cultural events in all Brazilian states as well as abroad.

In addition, it maintains cultural spaces in Rio de Janeiro, São Paulo, Minas Gerais, and Distrito Federal, and makes part of its collection available for free on the Internet.

History

The first Funarte 
It was created in 1975, still during the military dictatorship, by Minister Ney Braga to promote, stimulate, and develop cultural activities throughout Brazil. In the beginning, it was active in music (popular and classical), plastic and visual arts. At the time, it worked together with the National Institute of Folklore (INF), the National Foundation of Scenic Arts (Fundacen), and the Brazilian Cinema Foundation (FCB), all linked to the Ministry of Education and Culture, later renamed to Ministry of Culture.

In 1985, the foundation was chaired by cartoonist Ziraldo. Under the cartoonist's command, Funarte also acted as a syndicate (an agency for the distribution of newspaper strips and pastimes).

Original Funarte and second Funarte 
When Fernando Collor de Mello became president in 1990, he abolished all cultural institutions. In December of that year, he created the Brazilian Institute of Art and Culture (IBAC) - directly linked to the Secretariat of Culture of the Presidency of the Republic, which became a ministry sometime later. IBAC encompassed Funarte, Fundacen, and FCB. With the closing of Funarte, a new distributor of newspaper strips, Pacatatu, emerged.

In 1994, the acronym Funarte replaced the acronym IBAC.

Presidents 

 1975-1981 - José Cândido de Carvalho.
 1981-1982 - Aloísio Magalhães.
 1983-1984 - Edméa Falcão (executive director).
 1985 - Ziraldo Alves Pinto.
 1985-1989 - Ewaldo Correia Lima.
 1989-1990 - Edino Krieger.
 1990-1992 extinct.
 1992-1995 - Ferreira Gullar.
 1995-2002 - Márcio Souza.
 2003-2007 - Antonio Grassi.
 2007-2008 - Celso Frateschi.
 2008-2010 - Sérgio Mamberti.
 2011-2013 - Antonio Grassi.
 2013-2015 - Guti Fraga.
 2015-2016 - Francisco Bosco.
 2016-2019 - Stepan Nercessian.
 2019 - Miguel Proença.
 2019 - Dante Mantovani.
 2021 - Tamoio Marcondes.
 2023 - Maria Marighella.

References 

Arts in Brazil
Arts foundations
1975 establishments